Acton Regional County Municipality is a regional county municipality located in the Montérégie region of Quebec. The seat is Acton Vale.

Founded in 1982, the Acton Regional County Municipality is made up of eight smaller municipalities containing a little fewer than 16,000 people.  The average population density is 26.9 per square kilometre. About half of the population is concentrated in the town of Acton Vale.

Subdivisions
There are 8 subdivisions within the RCM:

Cities & Towns (1)
 Acton Vale

Municipalities (3)
 Béthanie
 Saint-Théodore-d'Acton
 Upton

Parishes (2)
 Saint-Nazaire-d'Acton
 Sainte-Christine

Townships (1)
 Roxton

Villages (1)
 Roxton Falls

Demographics
Mother tongue from Canada 2016 Census

Transportation

Access Routes
Highways and numbered routes that run through the municipality, including external routes that start or finish at the county border:

 Autoroutes
 

 Principal Highways
 
 

 Secondary Highways
 
 
 

 External Routes
 None

Attractions and Other Areas
La Campagnarde Trail

See also
 List of regional county municipalities and equivalent territories in Quebec

References

External links
  Official Web Site of Acton Regional County Municipality

 
Census divisions of Quebec